The 2013 San Diego Toreros football team represented the University of San Diego during the 2013 NCAA Division I FCS football season. They were led by first-year head coach Dale Lindsey and played their home games at Torero Stadium. They were a member of the Pioneer Football League. They finished the season 8–3, 7–1 in PFL play which would have been good enough for a tie for the league title. However, San Diego declared itself ineligible for the league title after improper scholarships were offered to football players. Their official conference record for the season is recognized as 0–0.

Schedule

References

San Diego
San Diego Toreros football seasons
San Diego Toreros football